Two's Company is a 1936 British comedy film directed by Tim Whelan and starring Ned Sparks, Gordon Harker and Mary Brian.

It was made at British and Dominions Elstree Studios.

Premise
An American millionaire rents a country house from an English aristocrat and the two constantly fight. However, their children have secretly fallen in love.

Cast
 Ned Sparks as Al 
 Gordon Harker as Muggridge 
 Mary Brian as Julia Madison 
 Patric Knowles as Lord Jerry Wendower 
 Henry Holman as B. G. Madison 
 Olive Blakeney as Mrs. Madison 
 Morton Selten as Earl of Warke 
 Robb Wilton as Mr. Muddlecombe 
 Gibb McLaughlin as Toombs 
 H. F. Maltby as Otto Stump 
 Syd Crossley as Ives 
 Robert Nainby as Assistant J.P.

References

Bibliography
 Low, Rachael. Filmmaking in 1930s Britain. George Allen & Unwin, 1985.
 Wood, Linda. British Films, 1927-1939. British Film Institute, 1986.

External links

1936 films
1936 comedy films
British comedy films
Films directed by Tim Whelan
British black-and-white films
British and Dominions Studios films
Films shot at Imperial Studios, Elstree
Films produced by Paul Soskin
Films set in country houses
Films with screenplays by John Paddy Carstairs
1930s English-language films
1930s British films
English-language comedy films